Simon Jonathan Sebag Montefiore (born 27 June 1965) is a British historian, television presenter and author of popular history books and novels,
including Stalin: The Court of the Red Tsar (2003), Monsters: History's Most Evil Men and Women (2008), Jerusalem: The Biography (2011), The Romanovs 1613–1918 (2016), among others.

Early life
Simon Sebag Montefiore was born in London. His father was psychotherapist Stephen Eric Sebag Montefiore (1926–2014), a great-grandson of the banker Sir Joseph Sebag-Montefiore (1822-1903), the nephew and heir of the wealthy philanthropist Sir Moses Montefiore considered by some "the most important Jew of the 19th century". Simon's mother was Phyllis April Jaffé, (1927–2019) from the Lithuanian branch of the Jaffe family. Her parents fled the Russian Empire at the beginning of the 20th century. They bought tickets for New York City, but were cheated, being instead dropped off at Cork, Ireland. Due to the Limerick boycott in 1904 her father Henry Jaffé left the country and moved to Newcastle upon Tyne, England. Simon's brother is Hugh Sebag-Montefiore.

The Montefiore family are descended from a line of wealthy Sephardi Jews who were diplomats and bankers all over Europe and who originated from Morocco and Italy. After the Alhambra Decree was issued against the Jews in Spain of 1492, some of Montefiore's ancestors stayed in the country whilst remaining secretly Jewish. During the reign of Philip II of Spain, one of them became governor of a province of Mexico, where he and his family were denounced by a political rival and tortured by the Inquisition. Two teenaged girls were burned alive in Mexico City while a son escaped to Italy and changed his name to Montefiore.

Sebag Montefiore was educated at Ludgrove School and Harrow School where he was editor of the school newspaper, The Harrovian. In the autumn of 1983 he interviewed Margaret Thatcher for The Harrovian. He won an Exhibition to read history at Gonville and Caius College, Cambridge where he received his Doctorate of Philosophy (PhD).

Career
Montefiore worked as a banker, a foreign affairs journalist, and a war correspondent covering the conflicts during the fall of the Soviet Union.

Montefiore's book Catherine the Great & Potemkin was shortlisted for the Samuel Johnson Prize, the Duff Cooper Prize, and the Marsh Biography Award. Stalin: The Court of the Red Tsar won History Book of the Year at the 2004 British Book Awards. Young Stalin won the LA Times Book Prize for Best Biography, the Costa Book Award, the Bruno Kreisky Award for Political Literature, Le Grand Prix de la Biographie Politique and was shortlisted for the James Tait Black Memorial Prize. Jerusalem: The Biography was a number one non-fiction Sunday Times bestseller and a global bestseller and won The Jewish Book of the Year Award from the Jewish Book Council. His latest history book is The Romanovs, 1613–1918.

Montefiore's debut novel King's Parade was published in 1991. The Spectator called the book "embarrassing" and "extremely silly".
Montefiore is also the author of the novels One Night in Winter and Sashenka. One Night in Winter won the Political Novel of the Year Prize and was longlisted for the Orwell Prize. He is a Fellow of the Royal Society of Literature and a Visiting Professor of Humanities at the University of Buckingham.

Personal life
Montefiore lives in London with his wife, the novelist Santa Montefiore, and their two children. The couple are friends of King Charles III and the  Queen Consort.

Films and TV drama series
Several of Montefiore's books are now being developed as either films or TV drama series. In February 2017, Angelina Jolie announced that she was developing "Simon Sebag Montefiore's Catherine the Great and Potemkin" with Universal Studios. Also in early 2017, the film studio Lionsgate Films announced it had bought Montefiore's Jerusalem: the Biography to make it into a long running multi episodic TV drama series which will be "character-driven, action-filled account of war, betrayal, faith, fanaticism, slaughter, persecution and co-existence in the universal holy city through the ages." Montefiore has likened it to Game of Thrones. The film scriptwriter and director Neil Jordan has been attached to the project to adapt the book for television, and he will also be acting as producer. In April 2016, 21st Century Fox announced that its animated division Blue Sky Studios, makers of the Ice Age series, had bought "Royal Rabbits of London", the children's series of books written by Montefiore and Santa Montefiore, to develop into an animated feature film. In July 2018 it was announced that the screenwriter Will Davies has been attached to the project to adapt the book for the screen. Also in July 2018, it was announced that Hat Trick Productions had taken up an option on Montefiore's novel One Night in Winter, in order to make a TV adaption.

Reviews

Montefiore's last non-fiction book The Romanovs 1613–1918 (2016) was accused of containing several historical errors by Swedish historian Dick Harrison. However, it has also received many favourable reviews. Olga Grushin in the New York Times observed that the book is "Spellbinding ... This monumental work is an essential addition to the library of anyone interested in Russian history." Stephen Kotkin in the Wall Street Journal praised the book and noted that "No author writes better than Montefiore whose perceptiveness and portraiture here are frequently sublime ... a marvellous read and the last third from fin de siecle insanity to revolutionary cataclysm is dazzling." The historian Antony Beevor noted that the book provided "Epic history on the grandest scale". For The Observer John Kampfner described Montefiore's book as "Riveting ... the research is meticulous and the style is captivating".

Fiction reviews
Montefiore has written a Moscow Trilogy of fictional thrillers, set in Russia. These have received positive reviews. Sashenka (2008) was described by the Washington Post as "Spellbinding. Sashenka is a historical whodunit with the epic sweep of a Hollywood movie. Montefiore is a natural storyteller who brings his encyclopedic knowledge of Russian history to life in language that glitters like the ice of St Petersburg". The Wall Street Journal praised "This superb novel. Sashenka is unforgettable. Inspiring. Montefiore proves a matchless storyteller, his prose harrowing and precise."

One Night in Winter (2013) was described by The Guardian as "A gripping thriller about private life and poetic dreams in Stalin's Russia ... A gripping pageturner ... Whether its subject is power or love, a darkly enjoyable read."

The last novel in the trilogy, Red Sky at Noon (2017), was called "a deeply satisfying pageturner – mythic and murderous" by The Times and "brilliant on multiple levels ... offering historical accuracy, a fine empathy for his characters and a story that illuminates the operatic tragedy of Stalin's Russia" by Booklist.

Books
Non-fiction
 Catherine the Great and Potemkin (2001) (originally published as The Prince of Princes: The Life of Potemkin)
 Stalin: The Court of the Red Tsar (2003)
 Young Stalin (2007)
 Monsters: History's Most Evil Men and Women (2008)
 Jerusalem: The Biography (2011)
 Titans of History (2012)
 The Romanovs 1613–1918 (2016)
 The World: A Family History of Humanity (2022)

Fiction
 King's Parade (1991)
 My Affair with Stalin (1997)
 Sashenka (2008)
 One Night in Winter (2013)
 Red Sky at Noon (2017)

Children's books (with Santa Montefiore)
 Royal Rabbits of London (2016)
 Royal Rabbits of London: Escape from the Tower (2017)

Television

Jerusalem: The Making of a Holy City, 3 part series, 8 December 2011 – 23 December 2011
Rome: A History of the Eternal City, 3 part series, 5–19 December 2012
Byzantium: A Tale of Three Cities, 3 part series, 5 December 2013 – 19 December 2013
Blood and Gold: The Making of Spain, 3 part series, 8 December 2015 – 22 December 2015
Vienna: Empire, Dynasty And Dream, 3 part series, 8 December 2016 – 22 December 2016

CDs
Speeches that Changed The World

DVDs

Jerusalem: The Making of a Holy City, BBC, 2011
Byzantium and the History of Faith

References

External links
Author website

"By the Book" interview with the New York Times

1965 births
Living people
People educated at Ludgrove School
People educated at Harrow School
Alumni of Gonville and Caius College, Cambridge
English people of Moroccan descent
British people of Lithuanian-Jewish descent
English Sephardi Jews
British writers
British historians
Jewish historians
British Jewish writers
Historians of Russia
Academics of the University of Buckingham
Fellows of the Royal Society of Literature
Stalinism-era scholars and writers
Simon